The 1997 European Historic Grand Prix was the second round of the 1997 International Sports Racing Series season.  It took place at Circuit Zolder, Belgium for a length of one hour and forty-five minutes on August 3, 1997.

Official results 
Class winners in bold.

External links
 World Sports Racing Prototypes - Results

Z
International Sports Racing Series Zolder
Auto races in Belgium